Atar Club is a Malian football club based in Bamako. In 2012 they played in the top division in Malian football.

Currently they play in the Malien Second Division.

Stadium
Their home stadium is Stade Municipal de Bamako.

League participations
Malian Première Division: 2012–2013
Malien Second Division: ?-2012, 2013–

References

External links
Soccerway

Football clubs in Mali
Sport in Bamako